Eddy Javier Díaz (born September 29, 1971) is a former second baseman and right-handed batter who played in Major League Baseball for the Milwaukee Brewers in 1997.

In a season as a backup with the Brewers, Díaz went 11-for-50 for a .220 batting average with seven RBI, four runs, two doubles and one triple in 16 games.

Following his Major League career, Díaz played in Nippon Professional Baseball and the Korea Baseball Organization.

See also
 List of Major League Baseball players from Venezuela

References

External links
, or Retrosheet

1971 births
Living people
Appleton Foxes players
Bellingham Mariners players
Cardenales de Lara players
Hanwha Eagles players
Hiroshima Toyo Carp players
Jacksonville Suns players
Leones de Yucatán players
Louisville Redbirds players
Major League Baseball second basemen
Major League Baseball players from Venezuela
Mexican League baseball first basemen
Mexican League baseball managers
Mexican League baseball third basemen
Milwaukee Brewers players
Navegantes del Magallanes players
Nippon Professional Baseball second basemen
Nippon Professional Baseball shortstops
Nippon Professional Baseball third basemen
Pastora de los Llanos players
Pawtucket Red Sox players
Sportspeople from Barquisimeto
Port City Roosters players
San Bernardino Spirit players
SSG Landers players
Tacoma Rainiers players
Tucson Toros players
Vaqueros Laguna players
Venezuelan expatriate baseball players in Japan
Venezuelan expatriate baseball players in Mexico
Venezuelan expatriate baseball players in South Korea
Venezuelan expatriate baseball players in the United States